The Saint Andrew's Day Assembly was the name of a Serbian parliament which was in session from  (Saint Andrew's Day) to 29 January 1859 in the Great Brewery in Belgrade, Principality of Serbia. There were a total of 432 representatives who were appointed by the Prince and were not elected.

After the Ottoman Empire, the nominal suzerain of the Principality of Serbia at the time, was forced by the Concert of Europe to implement internal reforms, the then Prince of Serbia Alexander Karađorđević convened parliament due to pressure from domestic opposition. At the end of the 1850s, the monarch was very unpopular, which was exploited by two dominant political groups, the Liberals and the Defenders of the Constitution. At the session of the assembly, the groups proposed for Alexander to abdicate and to invite former Prince Miloš Obrenović (who had previously ruled from 1817 to 1839) to assume the throne again.

References

Sources 
 

Principality of Serbia
Elections in Serbia
1858 in Serbia
1858 in the Ottoman Empire
19th century in Belgrade
1858 elections in Europe
1858 conferences